Lego The Angry Birds Movie was a Lego theme based on Rovio Entertainment's video game series of the same name and the same of the film. It was licensed from Columbia Pictures and Rovio Animation. The theme was first introduced in April 2016. The product line was discontinued by the end of 2017.

Overview 
Lego The Angry Birds Movie was based on the film. The product line focused on a group of birds (Bomb, Chuck, Matilda, Mighty Eagle, Red and Stella) whose eggs are stolen by the green piggies, who wish to eat them. The green piggies are led by the evil King Leonard Mudbeard, who is assisted by Biker Pig, Chef Pig, Foreman Pig, Pilot Pig, Pirate Pig and many piggies. Lego The Angry Birds Movie aimed to recreate the main characters in Lego form, including named Bomb, Chuck, Matilda, Mighty Eagle, Red and Stella. In addition, The Lego Group built a life-sized model of Red, a red bird who appears in The Angry Birds Movie film.

Development 
In partnership with Rovio Entertainment, The Lego Group created a construction toy line that was launched in Spring 2016 to coincide with the global theatrical release of The Angry Birds Movie film. The Lego Group VP of licensing and entertainment Jill Wilfert stated, "Our designers are having fun developing building sets that leverage the engaging play and deconstruction found in the Angry Birds game."

Launch 
Lego The Angry Birds Movie theme was launched at the New York Toy Fair in 2016. As part of the marketing campaign, The Lego Group released six toy sets based on the first film. Each set featured a different castle, pirate ship and vehicles. Minifigures including Bomb, Chuck, Matilda, Mighty Eagle, Red and Stella were released as well. Several green piggies including Biker Pig, Chef Pig, Foreman Pig, King Pig (Leonard), Leonard, Piggy, Pilot Pig and Pirate Pig were released as well.

Construction Sets 
According to Bricklink, The Lego Group released a total of six Lego sets as part of Lego The Angry Birds Movie theme. It was discontinued by the end of 2017.

In 2016, The Lego Group announced a partnership with Columbia Pictures and Rovio Animation to create a licensing and merchandising programme based on The Angry Birds Movie film, which was released on 2 April 2016. The six sets being released were Piggy Car Escape (set number: 75821), Piggy Plane Attack (set number: 75822), Bird Island Egg Heist (set number: 75823), Pig City Teardown (set number: 75824), Piggy Pirate Ship (set number: 75825) and King Pig's Castle (set number: 75826). The sets were designed primarily for children aged 6 to 14 years old. The Angry Birds Action! App tied with construction sets.

Piggy Car Escape 
Piggy Car Escape (set number: 75821) was released on 2 April 2016. The set consisted of 74 pieces with two minifigures. Piggy Car included variety of accessories, a driver's seat and an ice cream shooter. The set included Lego minifigures of Chuck and a Piggy.

Piggy Plane Attack 
Piggy Plane Attack (set number: 75822) was released on 2 April 2016. The set consisted of 168 pieces with two minifigures. Pilot Pig's Piggy Plane included a cockpit for Pilot Pig, a joystick and two flick missiles. It also included a catapult and variety of accessories. The catapult was used to launch Red at the Piggy Plane. The set included Lego minifigures of Red and Pilot Pig.

Bird Island Egg Heist 
Bird Island Egg Heist (set number: 75823) was released on 2 April 2016. The set consisted of 277 pieces with three minifigures. Bird Island Egg Heist included Matilda's House and a Piggy Trike. Biker Pig's Piggy Trike included a giant front wheel and a variety of accessories. The Piggy Trike didn't appear in the film unlike Matilda's house. It also included Billy the Sign and accessories. The set included Lego minifigures of Red, Matilda and Biker Pig.

Pig City Teardown 
Pig City Teardown (set number: 75824) was released on 2 April 2016. The set consisted of 386 pieces with four minifigures. Pig City included a hot dog stand, a small house and a falling boulder. The hot dog stand didn't appear in the film. Target zones included the boulder, the zip-lining pig and the bridge. It also included a catapult and variety of accessories. The catapult was used to launch Red at the Target zones. The set included Lego minifigures of Red, Stella and two piggies.

Piggy Pirate Ship 
Piggy Pirate Ship (set number: 75825) was released on 2 April 2016. The set consisted of 620 pieces with four minifigures. Piggy Pirate Ship included sails, flags, a winch with a boulder attached to it, a crane with a net, wheelhouse and a galley. It also included a crossbow shooter, a jetty-themed catapult and variety of accessories. The jetty catapult was used to launch Red and Bomb at the Piggy Pirate Ship. The set included Lego minifigures of Red, Bomb, Pirate Pig and Leonard.

King Pig's Castle 
King Pig's Castle (set number: 75826) was released on 2 April 2016. The largest set consisted of 859 pieces with five minifigures. King Pig's Castle included an opening gate, collapsible mini-tower and the hangar. Target zones included Golden Crown Tower with a boulder, collapsible tower and the hangar. It also included six eggs and variety of accessories, one of them being blue like in the film's climax. The catapult, in the form of a slingshot was used to launch Red at the Target zones. The set included Lego minifigures of Red, Mighty Eagle, King Pig (Leonard), Chef Pig and Foreman Pig.

Web Shorts 
The product line was accompanied by a series of animated short films that was released on YouTube inspired by both The Angry Bird Movie film as well as the Lego toyline.

Lego The Angry Birds Movie (Shorts)
The 6 web shorts have been released on YouTube.

See also 
 Rovio Entertainment
 Lego Prince of Persia
 Lego Minecraft
 Lego Ghostbusters
 Lego Overwatch
 Lego Super Mario

References

External links
 

Angry_Birds_Movie
Angry Birds
Products introduced in 2016
Products and services discontinued in 2017
Lego themes based on video games